Uzhaippali is a 1993 Indian Tamil-language action drama film, written and directed by P. Vasu. It stars Rajinikanth and Roja. The film was released on 24 June 1993 and became a box office success.

Plot 

Rajini works as a coolie in a factory. He is asked by three brothers to feign to be a foreign-returned rich man, the heir of a property. Rajini acts, but always escapes as he doesn't want to face consequences. But then he discovers that he is the heir to the property, his father was killed by three brothers to take away the property and mother became a mental patient. He avenges the death of his father by killing the villains. At last, he says he doesn't want to be an heir to money and always remains a coolie.

Cast 

 Rajinikanth as Tamilarasan/Tamilazhagan
 Roja as Vimala
 Radha Ravi as Ragupathy
 S. S. Chandran as Seethapathy
 Nizhalgal Ravi as Gajapathy
 Goundamani as P. A. of Lawyer Balasubramaniam
 Vijayakumar as Tamilarasan's brother-in-law
 Visu as Lawyer Balasubramaniam
 Sujatha as Janaki
 Prathapachandran as Doctor
 Vivek as Tamilarasan's friend
 Mayilsamy as Tamilarasan's friend
 Charle as Tamilarasan's friend
 Chokkalinga Bhagavathar as Tamilarasan's coworker

 Ravichandran as Tamilarasan's father

 Rupini (Special appearance in the song "Oru Maina")
 Pallavi (Special appearance in the song "Oru Maina")
 Shagufta Ali (Special appearance in the song "Oru Maina")
 Viji (Special appearance in the song "Uzhaippali Illatha")
 Raghava Lawrence (Special appearance in the song "Uzhaippali Illatha")

Production 
Uzhaippali marked the comeback of Vijaya Productions who stopped producing for 20 years. This was P. Vasu's third collaboration with Rajinikanth after Panakkaran and Mannan. Unlike those films, this was not a remake, but an original story written by Vasu. Distributors issued a red card against Rajinikanth when he participated in a meeting with them and arguing about actors not slashing their salaries.

Uzhaippali was launched with a pooja at Vijaya Vauhini studio on 5 February 1993. The pooja was conducted even though the distributors we're not willing to distribute the film and the Red Card against Rajinikanth was not removed as Rajinikanth.

When the shooting was happening in Chikmagalur, cast and crew were refused to book rooms in hotel for not paying the discount, Rajinikanth was sleeping in car due to non-availability. Vasu completed the film in 58 days.

Soundtrack 
The soundtrack was composed by Ilaiyaraaja, and the lyrics were written by Vaali.

Release and reception 
Uzhaippali was released on 24 June 1993. The film was much in news as, distributors banned Rajinikanth films and to resolve the issue, Rajinikanth met Kamal Haasan and the next day, Uzhaippali was announced. The film was released straight in theatres without the support of distributors and become a hit by running more than 100 days. When the film was ready for release, producer was in doldrums how to release it when there is Red Card on Rajinikanth. Rajinikanth came up with an idea to distribute the film directly to theatres. Rajinikanth distributed the film in NSC through his distribution company Ramana Film Distributors. In Chennai, Uzhaippali released in Albert, Abirami, Kamala, Crown and Sri Brinda. The film opening reservation was fabulous and almost 15 days houseful in reservation. The opening report was fantastic and became talk of the town. Uzhaippali had a non-stop run for 116 days in Chennai's Albert and Abirami and 150 days in Madurai's Cine Priya. The film released in overseas too especially in Singapore and Malaysia doing decent business.

The Indian Express wrote "Uzhaippali is a neat, unpretentious entertainer from reel one and Vasu has kept up the pace of narration without a moment's boredom". At the 14th Cinema Express Awards, S. P. Balasubrahmanyam won the Best Playback Singer award.

References

External links 
 

1990s Tamil-language films
1993 films
Films directed by P. Vasu
Films shot in Karnataka
Indian action drama films
Films scored by Ilaiyaraaja
Films scored by Karthik Raja